The KTDU-35 (GRAU Index 11D62) was a Soviet spacecraft propulsion system composed of two liquid rocket engines, the primary, S5.60 (SKD) and the secondary S5.35 (DKD), fed from the same propellant tanks. Both engines burn UDMH and AK27I in the gas generator cycle. It was designed by OKB-2, the famous Isaev Design Bureau, for the original Soyuz programme.

Within the Soyuz and Progress, the SKD is the primary engine, the DKD is the backup engine for main orbital correction and de-orbit operations. The SKD nozzle is fixed in the aft of the craft, and the dual DKD nozzles are on either side. The spacecraft attitude system (DPO) is responsible for pointing the vehicle in the correct direction and keep it that way during SKD burns.

Versions
This engine has been used in three variants:
 S5.53: Orbital correction engine for the lunar version of the Soyuz.
 S5.60 (AKA KTDU-35 GRAU Index 11D62): Version for the LEO version of the Soyuz.
 S5.66 (AKA KTDU-66): Maneuvering engine version for the Salyut 1 and Salyut 4 stations. Increased burn time to 1000 seconds and increased number of starts. Also was composed of primary and secondary engines.

See also
Soyuz 7K-OK
Soyuz 7K-OKS
Soyuz 7K-T
Soyuz 7K-TM
Progress 7K-TG
Isaev
S5.4

References

External links
 KB KhIMMASH Official Page (in Russian)

Rocket engines of Russia
Rocket engines of the Soviet Union
Rocket engines using hypergolic propellant